Vidny (masculine), Vidnaya (feminine), or Vidnoye (neuter) is the name of several inhabited localities in Russia.

Urban localities
Vidnoye, Moscow Oblast, a town in Leninsky District of Moscow Oblast

Rural localities
Vidny, Stavropol Krai, a settlement in Stavropolsky Selsoviet of Blagodarnensky District of Stavropol Krai
Vidny, Ulyanovsk Oblast, a settlement in Novoselkinsky Rural Okrug of Melekessky District of Ulyanovsk Oblast
Vidny, Voronezh Oblast, a settlement in Dobrinskoye Rural Settlement of Talovsky District of Voronezh Oblast
Vidnoye, Khabarovsk Krai, a selo in Vyazemsky District of Khabarovsk Krai